Portland Communications is a political consultancy and public relations agency set up in 2001 by Tim Allan, a former  adviser to Tony Blair and Director of Communications at BSkyB. In 2012 a majority stake in Portland was purchased by Omnicom.

Portland provides communications and public affairs advice to brands and high-profile individuals.

Staff 
As of January 2016, Portland partners include the former political editor of The Sun, George Pascoe-Watson, Mark Flanagan and Labour candidate Kevin McKeever.

In January 2012, Portland Communications hired James O'Shaughnessy, Prime Minister David Cameron's former director of policy, as Chief Policy Advisor.  The Independent reported that O'Shaughnessy failed to inform the Whitehall committee which vets jobs for officials leaving Government, which was described by Sir Alistair Graham, the former chairman of the Committee of Standards in Public Life, as a "serious error of judgement". Portland also employed Cameron's former Press Secretary, George Eustice. O'Shaughnessy was elevated to the peerage in 2015.

Clients 

Current and previous clients include the British Bankers' Association, Tullow Oil, BTA Bank, AkzoNobel and AB InBev on behalf of its Stella Artois brand.

Controversies

Wikipedia editing

In January 2012, MP Tom Watson discovered that Portland Communication had tried to remove references to a client's brand of lager, Stella Artois, from the wife-beater disambiguation page in Wikipedia. The beer had become known in the UK as the "wife-beater", in part because of its high alcohol content, and perceived connection with aggression and binge drinking.

Qatar
In 2014 it was revealed that Portland had been hired for $150,000 by Qatar "for a communications/political push targeted at Congress and federal agencies to improve ties with the US".

The firm admitted to on-line attacks of critics of their client, the government of Qatar, who are hosting the 2022 World Cup.

Labour Party conspiracy accusations	
In 2016, left-wing political website The Canary alleged that Portland staff were behind the orchestration of a "coup" against the Leader of the Labour Party, Jeremy Corbyn, after a wave of mass resignations from his front bench. Len McCluskey of British and Irish trade union Unite told Andrew Marr on his Sunday morning programme that "I'm amazed that some of the MPs have fallen into a trap." Referring to Portland Communications as a "sinister force", McCluskey said, "This is a PR company with strong links to Tony Blair and right-wing Labour MPs who've been involved in this orchestrated coup, and the coup has failed". Portland Communications denied any allegations as "a ridiculous conspiracy theory and completely untrue".

References

External links
 Portland Communications
 List of clients on APPC register

Companies based in the City of Westminster
Companies established in 2001
Public relations companies of the United Kingdom
Conflict-of-interest editing on Wikipedia